Mohamed Nagi Alassam is a Sudanese pro-democracy activist and physician who helped in organising the longest physicians' strike in history during the Sudanese revolution, which lasted until Omar Al-Bashir's government was overthrown. Alassam also took on the role of spokesperson and executive committee member for the Sudanese Professionals Association (SPA), which was crucial in organising and rallying the Sudanese people for a nonviolent revolution. He was the first SPA member to come out publicly, and he was arrested on January 4, 2019, days after start of the revolution.

After being held for 98 days by the General Intelligence Service (Sudan), he was freed after the overthrown of Omar al-Bashir. Following his release, he represented the SPA in the civilian-military negotiations that resulted in the interim constitution that established the foundation for a power-sharing arrangement, i.e., Forces of Freedom and Change. He has been a vocal critic of the Oct. 25 military takeover.

References 

Living people
1991 births
Date of birth missing (living people)
Sudanese physicians
Sudanese trade unionists
University of Kordofan alumni
Sudanese activists
Sudanese Revolution